Former Governor of Alabama George Wallace ran in the 1968 United States presidential election as the candidate for the American Independent Party against Richard Nixon and Hubert Humphrey. Wallace's pro-segregation policies during his term as Governor of Alabama were rejected by most. The impact of the Wallace campaign was substantial, winning the electoral votes of several states in the Deep South. Although Wallace did not expect to win the election, his strategy was to prevent either major party candidate from winning a majority in the Electoral College. This would throw the election into the House of Representatives, where Wallace would have bargaining power sufficient to determine, or at least strongly influence, the selection of a winner.

Although Nixon ultimately won a majority of 301 electoral votes (270 being a majority), Wallace's effort put the chance of a brokered electoral college relatively close. For example, had Wallace won South Carolina or Tennessee (falling less than 50,000 votes short) and had the Democratic ticket won either Illinois or Ohio (trailing the Republican one by around 100,000 votes in both cases) Nixon would have ended up with a plurality but not a majority, and the election would have been – for the first time since 1824 – brought before to the House of Representatives.

Campaign development
When George Wallace ran for President in 1968, it was not as a Democrat – which he had done in the 1964 Democratic primaries and would again in the 1972 Democratic primaries – but as a candidate of the American Independent Party. The American Independent Party was formed by Wallace, whose pro-segregation policies as governor had been rejected by the mainstream of the Democratic Party. In 1968 he ran on the idea that "there's not a dime's worth of difference between the two major parties". Wallace's strategy was essentially the same as that of Dixiecrat candidate Strom Thurmond in 1948 in that the campaign was run without any realistic chance of winning the election outright, but instead with the hope of receiving enough electoral votes to force the House of Representatives and the Senate decide the election, something many observers thought might happen. This would presumably give him the role of a power broker; Wallace hoped that southern states could use their clout to end federal efforts toward desegregation.

Wallace ran a campaign supporting law and order and states' rights on racial segregation. This strongly appealed to rural white Southerners and blue-collar union workers in the North. Wallace was leading the three-way race in the Old Confederacy with 45% of the vote in mid-September. Wallace's appeal to blue-collar workers and union members (who usually voted Democratic) hurt Hubert Humphrey in Northern states like Ohio, Illinois, New Jersey, Michigan, and Wisconsin. A mid-September AFL–CIO internal poll showed that one in three union members supported Wallace, and a Chicago Sun-Times poll showed that Wallace had a plurality of 44% of white steelworkers in Chicago.

However, both Humphrey and Richard Nixon were able to peel back some Wallace support by November; the unions highlighted the flow of Northern union jobs to Wallace's Alabama, a right-to-work state (although Wallace publicly opposed right-to-work laws), and Nixon persuaded enough Southerners that a "divided vote" would give the election to Humphrey. From October 13–20, Wallace's support fell from 20% to 15% nationally. In the North, the former Wallace vote split evenly between Humphrey and Nixon. In the border South, Wallace defectors were choosing Nixon over Humphrey by three to one. In the South, Nixon had the support of Wallace defectors over Humphrey, four to one.

Wallace's foreign policy positions set him apart from the other candidates in the field. "If the Vietnam War was not winnable within 90 days of his taking office, Wallace pledged an immediate withdrawal of U.S. troops ... Wallace also called foreign-aid money 'poured down a rat hole' and demanded that European and Asian allies pay more for their defense." These stances were overshadowed by Wallace's running mate, retired Air Force general Curtis LeMay, who implied he would use nuclear weapons to win the war.

The executive director of Wallace's 1968 campaign, Tom Turnipseed, a Mobile native, was later a member of the South Carolina State Senate and an attorney in Columbia, South Carolina. Not long after the 1968 campaign, Turnipseed began moving to the political left, joined the Americans for Democratic Action, and became active in the civil rights and environmental movements.

Vice presidential selection
Former Georgia governor Marvin Griffin was a temporary running mate in order to get the Wallace candidacy on the ballot in several states. The Wallace campaign considered former Secretary of Agriculture Ezra Taft Benson, KFC founder Harland Sanders, retired Air Force General Curtis LeMay, Hollywood actor John Wayne, and FBI Director J. Edgar Hoover as possible running mates. Benson and LeMay expressed interest, and Hoover did not even respond. In June, the campaign looked into several members of Congress, all of whom were unwilling to attach themselves to the Wallace ticket. Wallace's aides came to favor Happy Chandler, the former baseball commissioner and governor of Kentucky. It was hoped that Chandler could help put Wallace over the top in Tennessee, South Carolina, and Florida, where he was narrowly behind Nixon, and solidify support in Arkansas, Georgia, and North Carolina, where Wallace was leading. Wallace was cautious: Chandler had supported the hiring of Jackie Robinson by the Brooklyn Dodgers, and was now more of a mainstream liberal Democratic politician. Wallace was persuaded by early September; as one of Wallace's aides put it, "We have all the nuts in the country, we could get some decent people– you working one side of the street and he working the other side." When the "done deal" was leaked to the press, Wallace's supporters objected; Wallace's Kentucky campaign chair resigned, and influential donor Nelson Bunker Hunt demanded that Chandler be dropped from the ticket. Wallace retracted the invitation. Hunt's first choice for the second slot was Benson. Benson was barred by several leaders of the Church of Jesus Christ of Latter-day Saints from joining a Wallace ticket; Benson's membership in the Quorum of the Twelve Apostles would have caused an image problem for the church had he joined the Wallace ticket.

Wallace ended up persuading Curtis LeMay, who feared being labeled a racist, to join the campaign. LeMay was chairman of the board of an electronics company, and the company would dismiss him if he spent his time running for vice president; Hunt set up a million-dollar fund to reimburse him for any losses.

Curtis LeMay was an enthusiast for the use of nuclear weapons.  Wallace's aides tried to persuade him to avoid questions relating to the topic, but when asked about it at his first interview, he attempted to dispel American "phobias about nuclear weapons" and discussed radioactive landcrabs at Bikini atoll. LeMay again embarrassed Wallace's campaign in the fall by suggesting that nuclear weapons could be used in the Vietnam War, which led Humphrey to dub Wallace and LeMay the "Bombsey Twins". The selection of LeMay proved a disastrous drag on the campaign and was dubbed the "LeMay fiasco" internally. The selection reinforced Wallace's gender gap: in late September, Wallace's support stood at 50% in the Old Confederacy among men, and 40% among women. In the North, Wallace had 20% support among men, but less than half that among women.

Campaign rhetoric
Wallace's campaign rhetoric became famous, such as when he pledged "If any anarchists lie down in front of my automobile, it will be the last automobile they ever lie down in front of" and asserted that the only four letter words that hippies did not know were w-o-r-k and s-o-a-p. He accused Humphrey and Nixon of wanting to desegregate the South. Wallace proclaimed, "There's not a dime's worth of difference between the Democrat and Republican parties," a line that he had first used in 1966, when his first wife, Lurleen Burns Wallace, ran successfully for governor against the Republican James D. Martin.  The Wallace campaign in California and other states attracted the "Radical Right", including the John Birch Society.

Most mainstream media editorials expressed opposition to the Wallace campaign, but some southern newspapers enthusiastically backed him. George W. Shannon of the Shreveport Journal, for instance, wrote countless editorials supporting the third-party concept in presidential elections. Wallace repaid Shannon by appearing at Shannon's retirement dinner. In addition to Shannon, Pete Hamill of the New Left magazine Ramparts wrote that "Wallace and the black and radical militants ... share some common ground: local control of schools and institutions, a desire to radically change America, a violent distrust of the power structure and the establishment. In this year's election, the only one of the three major candidates who is a true radical is Wallace." New Leftist Jack Newfield, who by 1971 had become critical of both his movement and "consensus liberals" like Humphrey, wrote that year:

Many found Wallace an entertaining campaigner, regardless of whether they approved of his opinions. To hippies who said he was a Nazi, he replied, "I was killing fascists when you punks were in diapers." Another memorable quote: "They're building a bridge over the Potomac for all the white liberals fleeing to Virginia."

The Wallace campaign was comfortably ahead in Alabama, Mississippi, and Louisiana. Wallace's aides insisted that the campaign focus on winning the Carolinas, Florida, Georgia, and Tennessee. Wallace refused, stating that he was running a "national campaign," and traveled from Boston to San Diego in the campaign. There were rallies in 33 cities in the North during this period, but Wallace stopped only one time each in Tennessee, North Carolina, and Georgia.

On October 24, 1968, Wallace spoke at Madison Square Garden before "the largest political rally held in New York City since Franklin Roosevelt had denounced the forces of 'organized money' from the same stage in 1936". An overflow crowd of 20,000 packed the Garden while pro- and anti-Wallace protesters clashed with more than 1,000 police across the street. In a now-famous reference to a protester who had lain down in front of Lyndon B. Johnson's limousine the year before, Wallace stated, "I tell you when November comes, the first time they lie down in front of my limousine it'll be the last one they ever lay down in front of; their day is over!

When asked what he considered the "biggest domestic issue for 1968," Wallace replied:

On the campaign trail, Wallace often repeated this theme, saying:

General election results

Wallace's "outsider" status was once again popular with voters, particularly in the rural South. He won 9,901,118 popular votes (out of a total of 73,199,998)—that is, 13.53% of votes cast nationally—carried five Southern states - Alabama, Arkansas, Georgia, Louisiana, Mississippi - won 45 electoral votes plus one vote from a faithless elector, and came fairly close to receiving enough votes to throw the election to the House of Representatives. He was the first such person since Harry F. Byrd, an independent segregationist candidate in the 1960 presidential election. (John Hospers in 1972, Ronald Reagan in 1976, Lloyd Bentsen in 1988, John Edwards in 2004 and many non-candidates in 2016 all received one electoral vote from dissenters, but none earned those votes via the popular vote, and none except Hospers were actively running for president in the general election for those respective years.) Wallace also received the vote of one North Carolina elector who was pledged to Nixon.

Wallace's percentage vote of 13.53% is considerably less than the 19% won by Ross Perot in 1992 who unlike Wallace did not win any electoral votes.

Wallace was the most popular 1968 presidential candidate among young men. Wallace also proved to be popular among blue-collar workers in the North and Midwest, and he took many votes which might have otherwise gone to Humphrey.

Wallace's support in the North plummeted from 13% in early October to 8% by election day. Nixon won the Carolinas and Tennessee with less than 40% of the vote, with Wallace close behind. These were worth 32 electoral votes (though Wallace had received 1 electoral vote from North Carolina). Had Wallace won these states, Nixon would have won the election with 270 votes, the bare minimum. However, it is highly likely that a stronger Wallace performance would have handed Missouri, the closest state (a margin of 0.57%) and a border state, to Humphrey, which would have thrown the election to the House (which as explained earlier, was Wallace's intention all along). A change of around 1% in either Ohio or New Jersey would have also thrown the election to the House, had Wallace carried North Carolina or Tennessee. A Wallace win in either one of the Carolinas or Tennessee and a 1.14% shift in Ohio would be the simplest way for the election to be thrown to the House.

For Wallace to have denied Nixon the electoral vote majority himself, the closest way possible would be another 48,000 votes in Tennessee, 39,000 votes in South Carolina, 132,000 votes in North Carolina and 211,000 votes in Florida, a total of 430,000 votes which would have brought Nixon down to 256 electoral votes and Wallace up to 91 electoral votes. These states were all the ones that Wallace had come in second bypassing the need to get ahead of Humphrey.

1968 U.S. House election

Under the United States Constitution, the House of Representatives elects the President in the event no candidate receives a majority in the Electoral College.  Each state's House delegation receives one vote.  The map on the right indicates the majority party of each state's delegation following the 1968 United States House of Representatives elections – blue states being Democratic and red states being Republican.  This House would have elected the President had Wallace succeeded in denying his opponents an Electoral College majority.

As indicated on the map, Democrats controlled 26 of the 50 state house delegations, with Republicans controlling 19 delegations and the other five being evenly split.  Had the Democratic delegations all been firmly behind Humphrey, then Wallace might have found himself with little influence on post-election events even if he had succeeded in forcing the election into the House.  However, Wallace believed the Southern Democratic delegations would not support Humphrey without first obtaining substantial concessions with respect to federal desegregation measures, or might even have agreed to back Nixon if he agreed to Southern demands.

An alternative theory holds that had Wallace achieved his aim he could have pre-empted an election in the House by instructing his own electors to back one of the major party candidates – there was no legal or constitutional impediment that would have prevented him from doing so.  This would have allowed Wallace the opportunity to negotiate directly with the major candidates (provided he could have concluded such negotiations prior to the Electoral College formally casting its votes for president).  It has been postulated that Wallace might possibly have been able to come to an agreement with Nixon who (with his party controlling only 19 state delegations) might have been seen to have little prospect of being elected president without making some sort of arrangement with Wallace.

Endorsements

References

Bibliography

External links 
 George Wallace for President brochure
 TIME cover of October 18, 1968 with running mate Gen. Curtis LeMay
 The American Experience: George Wallace 1968 campaign
 Percentage of vote for AIP in 1968 election, charted by US counties
American Independent Party 1968 platform from UC Santa Barbara's The American Presidency Project

American Independent Party
1968 United States presidential campaigns
Right-wing populism in the United States
George Wallace